Iris Tallulah Elizabeth Law (born 25 October 2000) is an English fashion model and actress.

Early life 
Law was born in the district of Primrose Hill in the London Borough of Camden, to actors Jude Law and Sadie Frost; she has two brothers Rafferty and Rudy, one maternal half-brother, two paternal half-sisters, and another paternal half-sibling born in 2020. Her godmother is British supermodel Kate Moss. She completed her GCSEs in 2017. She is studying textiles at Central Saint Martins.

Career 
Law's career in fashion started with a photoshoot for a brand called Illustrated People, from there she was contacted by an agent; she was then chosen by Christopher Bailey to be the face of Burberry's beauty campaign. The next year, in 2016, she appeared in a resort look-book for Miu Miu. She has appeared in adverts for Marc Jacobs, La Perla, and Stella McCartney, as well as Lacoste, Calvin Klein, and Versace. In 2021, she became an ambassador for Dior Beauty. She made her runway debut at Miu Miu's A/W 2020 fashion show. She had already appeared in a Vogue editorial as a toddler.

Law was cast as Soo Catwoman in the miniseries Pistol, for which she shaved her head.

References 

Living people
2000 births
Actresses from London
Alumni of Central Saint Martins
IMG Models models
English female models
Models from London
People from the London Borough of Camden